Garra amirhosseini is a fish species in the genus Garra endemic to the Tigris River drainage in Iran.

References

External links 

Cyprinid fish of Asia
Fish described in 2016
Garra